Tamás Madarász (born 27 March 1987 in Debrecen, Hungary) is a Hungarian judoka. He competed at the 2012 Summer Olympics in the -90 kg event and lost his first match to Dilshod Choriev.

References

External links
 
 

Hungarian male judoka
1987 births
Living people
Olympic judoka of Hungary
Judoka at the 2012 Summer Olympics
Sportspeople from Debrecen
21st-century Hungarian people